Hame or hames may refer to:

Places 
 Häme, a geographical region of Finland
 Häme (constituency), a Finnish constituency represented in the Parliament of Finland
 Häme Province, a former province of Finland
 Hame, Debar, a village in North Macedonia

People 
 Hamé (born 1975), French filmmaker and rapper
 Hame Faiva (born 1994), New Zealand-born Italian rugby union player
 Hame Sele (born 1996), Australian rugby league footballer

Other uses 
 Antidesma platyphyllum, a species of flowering tree in the leafflower family
 Hame, a fictional planet in Isaac Asimov's Foundation series; see Trantor
 Hames, part of a horse collar; see Horse harness § Parts